Neoopisthopterus is a small genus of ray-finned fish in the family Pristigasteridae. There are currently two recognized species in this genus, both of which occur in tropical waters of the Western Hemisphere.

Species
 Neoopisthopterus cubanus Hildebrand, 1948 (Cuban longfin herring)
 Neoopisthopterus tropicus (Hildebrand, 1946) (Tropical longfin herring)

References
 

Pristigasteridae
Ray-finned fish genera
Marine fish genera
Taxa named by Samuel Frederick Hildebrand